Spartanburg is an unincorporated community in Greensfork Township, Randolph County, in the U.S. state of Indiana.

History
Spartanburg was first known as Newberg, and under the latter name was founded in 1832. A post office was established under the name Spartanburg in 1842, and remained in operation until it was discontinued in 1907.

The Union Literary Institute, a school founded by Quakers for African-American students, was 2 miles from Spartanburg

Geography

References

Unincorporated communities in Randolph County, Indiana
Unincorporated communities in Indiana